is a railway station in the Takadanobaba area of Tokyo's Shinjuku ward, situated between the commercial districts of Ikebukuro and Shinjuku.

The station is a major commuting hub, linking the Seibu Shinjuku Line, Tokyo Metro Tōzai Line and Yamanote Line. It also serves the surrounding Takadanobaba area, known as a popular student district, and is linked by bus to nearby Waseda University. It is the busiest station on the Seibu Shinjuku Line, and the second-busiest in the Seibu Railway network after Ikebukuro Station. It is the ninth-busiest station in the Tokyo Metro network and the eleventh-busiest station in the JR East network.

Lines
Takadanobaba Station is served by the following lines:

East Japan Railway Company (JR East)
 Yamanote Line
Seibu Railway
 Seibu Shinjuku Line
Tokyo Metro
Tokyo Metro Tōzai Line

Station layout

Platforms

Yamanote and Seibu Shinjuku Line
The Yamanote Line island platform and two Seibu Shinjuku Line platforms are located parallel to each other, and are connected by an overhead transfer concourse, as well as transfer gates at ground level by the main Waseda exit.

The theme music from Astro Boy is played prior to each train departure from the Yamanote Line platform, a homage to the series being set in the Takadanobaba area. Chest-high platform edge doors were brought into use on the Yamanote Line platform on 21 December 2013.

The Yamanote Freight Line tracks (used by Saikyo Line and Shonan-Shinjuku Line services) pass Takadanobaba running between the Yamanote Line and Seibu Shinjuku Line tracks.

Tozai Line

History
The Yamanote Line station opened on 15 September 1910.

Seibu Railway opened a temporary station perpendicular to the Yamanote Line in April 1927, followed by a permanent station parallel to the Yamanote Line in April 1928. The original station buildings were burned to the ground during the bombing of Tokyo in April 1945. Takadanobaba was the Tokyo terminal of the Seibu Railway Murayama Line (now Seibu Shinjuku Line) until it was extended to Seibu-Shinjuku Station in 1952.

The Tozai Line began service to Takadanobaba in December 1964 under the auspices of the Teito Rapid Transit Authority. Takadanobaba was the western terminus of the Tozai Line until the connection to Nakano Station and the Chuo Main Line opened in March 1966.

The station facilities of the Tozai Line were inherited by Tokyo Metro after the privatization of the Teito Rapid Transit Authority (TRTA) in 2004.

Station numbering was introduced on all Seibu Railway lines during fiscal 2012, with Takadanobaba being assigned station number SS02. Numbering was expanded to the JR East platforms in 2016 with the Yamanote Line station being assigned station number JY15.

Surrounding area
The surrounding area of Takadanobaba is often referred to as "Baba". It lacks the history of nearby Waseda and Mejiro, often conjuring up images of a student spot with its many cheap bars and izakaya serving the needs of students at nearby Waseda and Gakushuin universities. Numerous prep and vocational schools reinforce this image in the eyes of many Japanese.

The symbol of Takadanobaba is the monolithic and appropriately named Big Box building next to the station. Big Box houses a sports gym, swimming pool, Uniqlo clothing store, cafe, bowling alley, arcade, and a fast food restaurant. It has recently been reopened after an extensive renovation.

Passenger statistics
Daily average passenger figures for each operator are as shown below.

 Note that JR East figures account for boarding passengers only.

See also

 List of railway stations in Japan
 Transportation in Greater Tokyo

References

External links

 JR East station information 
 Seibu station information 
 Tokyo Metro station information 

Yamanote Line
Tokyo Metro Tozai Line
Seibu Shinjuku Line
Stations of East Japan Railway Company
Stations of Tokyo Metro
Stations of Seibu Railway
Railway stations in Tokyo
Railway stations in Japan opened in 1910